Therizhandur is a village in the Kuthalam of Mayiladuthurai district, Tamil Nadu, India.

Kambar Medu the birthplace of Tamil poet Kambar is here.

Etymology
Therezhandur means thear+ ezhandur.

Adjacent communities 
It was covered, in north side kuttlam, south side komal, east side asikkadu, west side thiruvavaduthurai.

Reference

External links 
 www.tzronline.in

Villages in Mayiladuthurai district